
Gmina Policzna is a rural gmina (administrative district) in Zwoleń County, Masovian Voivodeship, in east-central Poland. Its seat is the village of Policzna, which lies approximately 11 kilometres (7 mi) north-east of Zwoleń and 96 km (59 mi) south-east of Warsaw.

Villages
Gmina Policzna contains the villages and settlements of Aleksandrówka, Andrzejówka, Annów, Antoniówka, Biały Ług, Bierdzież, Chechły, Czarnolas, Czarnolas-Kolonia, Dąbrowa-Las, Florianów, Franków, Gródek, Helenów, Jabłonów, Jadwinów, Kolonia Chechelska, Kuszlów, Łuczynów, Ługowa Wola, Patków, Piątków, Policzna, Stanisławów, Świetlikowa Wola, Teodorów, Wilczowola, Władysławów, Wojciechówka, Wólka Policka, Wygoda, Zawada Nowa and Zawada Stara.

Neighbouring gminas
Gmina Policzna is bordered by the gminas of Garbatka-Letnisko, Gniewoszów, Pionki, Przyłęk, Puławy and Zwoleń.

References
Polish official population figures 2006

Policzna
Zwoleń County